ACS Energy Letters is a monthly peer-reviewed scientific journal published by the American Chemical Society. It was established in 2016 and the editor-in-chief is Prashant V. Kamat (University of Notre Dame). It covers research on all aspects of energy and aims for rapid publication.

Abstracting and indexing
The journal is abstracted and indexed in:
Ei Compendex
Current Contents/Engineering, Computing & Technology
Current Contents/Physical, Chemical & Earth Sciences
Inspec
Science Citation Index Expanded
Scopus
According to the Journal Citation Reports, the journal has a 2021 impact factor of 23.991.

Article types
The journal publishes the following article types: letters, energy express, reviews, perspectives, viewpoints, energy focus, and editorials.

References

External links

English-language journals
American Chemical Society academic journals
Chemistry journals
Monthly journals
Publications established in 2016
2016 establishments in the United States